Savoy cabbage (Brassica oleracea var. sabauda L. or Brassica oleracea Savoy Cabbage Group) is a variety of the plant species Brassica oleracea. Savoy cabbage is a winter vegetable and one of several cabbage varieties. It is named after the Savoy region in France. In Italy it is also known as Milan cabbage (cavolo di Milano) or Lombard cabbage (cavolo lombardo). It has crinkled, emerald green leaves.
The leaves are crunchy and tender. Known cultivars include 'Savoy King' (in the US), 'Tundra' (green with a firm, round heart) and 'Winter King' (with dark crumpled leaves).

Uses

Savoy cabbage maintains a firm texture when cooked. It has the same flavor and appearance as regular cabbage when cooked but retains a firm texture which is desired in some recipes. Savoy cabbage can be used in a variety of recipes. It pairs well with red wine, apples, spices, horseradish and meat. It can be used for roulades, in stews and soups, such as borscht, as well as roasted plain and drizzled with olive oil. It can be used in preserved recipes such as kimchi or sauerkraut, and with strong and unusual seasonings such as juniper.

Signs of desirable quality include cabbage that is heavy for its size with leaves that are unblemished and have a bright, fresh look. Peak season for most cabbages in the Northern Hemisphere runs from November through April.

Fresh whole cabbage will keep in the refrigerator for one to six weeks depending on type and variety. Hard green, white or red cabbages will keep the longest while the looser Savoy and Chinese varieties such as  bok choy need to be consumed more quickly. It is necessary to keep the outer leaves intact without washing when storing since moisture hastens decay.

Savoy can be difficult to grow as it is vulnerable to caterpillars, pigeons, and club root disease. It does best in full sun, and is winter-hardy, able to tolerate the cold, frost, and snow.

Nutrition
Raw Savoy cabbage is 91% water, 6% carbohydrates, 2% protein, and contains negligible fat (table). There are no other micronutrients in significant content (table).

See also
 January King cabbage (another winter cabbage)

References

External links
 
 Brassica oleracea var. sabauda L., Tropicos.org, Missouri Botanical Garden

Leaf vegetables
Cabbage
Food plant cultivars